In the 2011 Canadian census the number of persons who self-identified with The Church of Jesus Christ of Latter-day Saints was 105,365. The following tables and graphs use general population data taken from Statistics Canada using the first quarter 2020 population estimates. The official membership statistics as of Jan 1, 2020 provided by the Church of Jesus Christ of Latter-day Saints (LDS Church) was used for all other data.

Table

See also

 The Church of Jesus Christ of Latter-day Saints in Canada
 LDS membership statistics (World)
 LDS membership statistics (United States)

References

Membership statistics
Religious demographics